Democrat Gulch [elevation: ] is a ridge in Josephine County, Oregon, in the United States. 

Democrat Gulch was named from the fact a large share of early prospectors there were Democrats in politics.

References

Landforms of Josephine County, Oregon
Valleys of Oregon